Marble Creek Glacier is in North Cascades National Park in the U.S. state of Washington. Marble Creek Glacier is at the headwaters of Marble Creek, a major tributary of the Cascade River. The glacier lies to the NNW of Dorado Needle and is also  NNW of Eldorado Peak. To the east of Marble Creek Glacier lie the much larger Inspiration and McAllister Glaciers.

See also
List of glaciers in the United States

References

Glaciers of the North Cascades
Glaciers of Skagit County, Washington
Glaciers of Washington (state)